The Last Wish was a rock band from Houston, Texas, noted for being the first band of Blue October frontman Justin Furstenfeld.  Ryan Delahoussaye of Blue October played with The Last Wish at a couple shows, but he was never a member of the band.  Song writing collaboration was often shared by Greg Hammond, Amy Immel and Justin Furstenfeld.  The members of the band attended Bellaire High School, and HSPVA, and the group was started while the members were students.  The group built a strong fanbase in Houston, where they played several sold-out shows at Houston venues such as Zelda's, Fitzgerald's, Toads Tavern, Last Concert Café, Café Artiste, McGonigel's Mucky Duck, and The Abyss.  Furstenfeld left the group in 1995 while they were working on their third album.  Furstenfeld still plays Last Wish songs during his solo shows, and Blue October has played Last Wish songs on occasion.

The band released two albums, and a vinyl single which included the songs "Black Orchid", "Go On" and "Goodbye". "Black Orchid" appeared on Blue October's album, The Answers, in 1998 and on Furstenfeld's 2014 album, Songs from an Open Book.  A third album by The Last Wish was in the works, but the band broke up before it was finished.

Members
Justin Furstenfeld (vocals, guitar)
Amy Immel (vocals)
Katie Hartzog (violin)
 Michelle Trautwein (cello)
Greg Hammond (guitar)
Leital Molad (bass)
Brady Hammond (drums)
Abraham Diaz

Discography
1993 Rooftop Sessions
1995 The First of February

References

External links
The Last Wish Lyrics

Musical groups from Houston
Rock music groups from Texas
Musical groups established in 1989
Musical groups disestablished in 1995